The First Flag Unfurling Site is a historic site along the route of the Lewis and Clark Expedition in Lemhi County, Idaho. According to an entry in Clark's journal on August 13, 1805, Lewis unfurled an American flag at the site to greet two women whom the party encountered. Local researcher Dave Ainsworth determined that this encounter was the first time an American flag had been unfurled west of the Continental Divide; his findings were confirmed by a National Park Service historian.

The site was added to the National Register of Historic Places on August 22, 1975. At the time, the site was marked by a historic sign, though several parties were planning to install a monument.

References

National Register of Historic Places in Idaho
Lewis and Clark Expedition
Tourist attractions in Lemhi County, Idaho
National Register of Historic Places in Lemhi County, Idaho